Bruno–Pyatt High School is a comprehensive public high school serving students in grades seven through twelve in the remote, rural community of Eros, in unincorporated Marion County, Arkansas, United States, near Everton. It is the one of three high schools administered by the Ozark Mountain School District and the district's only high school in Marion County, Arkansas while supporting the rural communities of Bruno, Pyatt, Everton, and Eros.

It was formerly a part of the Bruno-Pyatt School District. On July 1, 2004 it consolidated into the Ozark Mountain School District.

Academics 
This Title I school is accredited by the Arkansas Department of Education (ADE). The assumed course of study follows the Smart Core curriculum developed the Arkansas Department of Education (ADE), which requires students to complete 22 credit units before graduation. Students engage in regular (core) and career focus courses and exams and may select Advanced Placement (AP) coursework and exams that may lead to college credit.

In 2005, a Bruno–Pyatt educator was presented with the Rural Teacher of the Year Award by the Arkansas Rural Education Association.

Athletics 
The Bruno–Pyatt High School mascot and athletic emblem is the American Patriot with patriotic school colors of red, white and blue. The Bruno–Pyatt Patriots participate in various interscholastic activities in the 1A West Conference administered by the Arkansas Activities Association. The school athletic activities include basketball (boys/girls), cheer, golf (boys/girls), baseball, and softball.

References

External links 
 

Public high schools in Arkansas
Schools in Marion County, Arkansas